Sandia is a town in Southern Peru, capital of the province Sandia in the region Puno.

References

Populated places in the Puno Region